Gary Hudson (August 29, 1949 − February 1, 2009) is a former basketball coach. He was the sixth head coach of the University of Oklahoma women's basketball program. While at Oklahoma, the program had a 39–45 record. Hudson was the first coach following the reinstatement of the women's basketball program at Oklahoma. Following his tenure at Oklahoma, he coached at Shawnee High School for five years before retiring due to health reasons. Prior to coaching, Hudson played college football at the University of Wyoming for one year before transferring to Augustana College. He also played minor league baseball in the Minnesota Twins organizations before he started his coaching career which included a stint as an assistant coach at Oregon State University.

References

1949 births
2009 deaths
American women's basketball coaches
Basketball coaches from Nebraska
Oklahoma Sooners women's basketball coaches
People from McCook, Nebraska